Lizzano in Belvedere is a comune (municipality) in the Metropolitan City of Bologna in the Italian region Emilia-Romagna, located about  southwest of Bologna.

Among the parishes is the church of San Pietro, Vidiciatico.

Twin towns — sister cities
Lizzano in Belvedere is twinned with:

  Hilzingen, Germany

References

External links
 Official website

Cities and towns in Emilia-Romagna